Leroy Milton Kelly (May 8, 1914 – February 21, 2002) was an American mathematician whose research primarily concerned combinatorial geometry. In 1986 he settled a conjecture of Jean-Pierre Serre by proving that n points in complex 3-space, not all lying on a plane, determine an ordinary line—that is, a line containing only two of the n points. He taught at Michigan State University.

Kelly received his Ph.D. at the University of Missouri in 1948, advised by Leonard Mascot Blumenthal.

Selected publications
.
.

References

1914 births
2002 deaths
20th-century American mathematicians
21st-century American mathematicians
Geometers
University of Missouri alumni
Michigan State University faculty